Kirnau is a river in Baden-Württemberg, Germany. It passes through the town of Osterburken and flows into the Seckach in Adelsheim.

See also
List of rivers of Baden-Württemberg

References

Rivers of Baden-Württemberg
Rivers of Germany